São João das Lampas e Terrugem is a civil parish in the municipality of Sintra, Lisbon District, Portugal. It was formed in 2013 by the merger of the former parishes São João das Lampas and Terrugem. The population in 2011 was 16,505, in an area of 83.60 km².

References

Parishes of Sintra